Andrew Russell may refer to:

Andrew Russell (Australian politician) (1808–1867), Australian politician and businessman
Andrew Russell (New Zealand politician) (1812–1900), British Army officer
Andrew J. Russell (1829–1902), American photographer
Sir Andrew Hamilton Russell (1868–1960), World War I New Zealand general
Andrew Russell, 15th Duke of Bedford (born 1962), English peer
Andrew Russell (Australian soldier) ( 1969–2002), Australian SAS soldier killed in Afghanistan
Andrew Russell (canoeist) (born 1983), Canadian canoeist
Andrew Russell (footballer) (born 1993), Scottish footballer
Andrew Russell (academic), British academic
Andrew Russell (baseball) (born 1984), Australian baseball pitcher

See also
Andy Russell (disambiguation)
Andrew Russel (1856–1934), American politician and banker in Illinois